Troll is a Swedish pop band most noted for the single "Jimmy Dean". Their first band name was Trollrock because they dressed up as Trolls on stage.

Band members Annika Larsson, Helena Caspersson, Erica Bergman, Nina Norberg, Petra Norén Dahl, Jenny Jons and Monica Blom were childhood friends from Falun.

Discography

Albums 
Stoppa Sabbet (1986)
Troll (1989)
Put Your Hands in the Air (1990)
Flashback #07 (1995)

Singles 
"It's a Miracle" (1987)
"Calling on Your Heart" (1988)
"On a Kangaroo" (1988)
"Jimmy Dean" (1989)
"It's Serious" (1990)
"Midsummer Night" (1990)
"Put Your Hands in the Air" (1990)
"The Greatest Kid in Town" (1991)

References

web.archive.org (in Swedish)

Swedish pop music groups
1985 establishments in Sweden
1992 disestablishments in Sweden
Falun
Musical groups disestablished in 1992
Musical groups established in 1985